Francesco Marmitta (ca. 1460-1505) was an Italian painter and jeweler. Marmitta was born in Parma, Italy, between 1462 and 1466. His father was a merchant of wool and wax. His work is held in the collections of the Metropolitan Museum of Art and the Walters Art Museum.

Gallery

References

15th-century Italian painters
Italian male painters
16th-century Italian painters
Painters from Parma
1460 births
1505 deaths